Tarakan is an island city in North Kalimantan, Indonesia.

Tarakan may also refer to:
 Mount Tarakan, a volcano in the Halmahera islands
 Battle of Tarakan (1942), a battle in World War II
 Battle of Tarakan (1945), a battle in World War II
 HMAS Tarakan (L 129), a heavy landing craft commissioned in 1973
 HMAS Tarakan (L3017), a tank landing ship commissioned in 1946

See also
Taraqan